Tamar Valley may refer to:

 Tamar Valley, England, in Devon and Cornwall in the south of England, UK
 Tamar Valley, Tasmania, on the Tamar River in the north of Tasmania, Australia